Montero may refer to:

 Montero (name), a list of people with the name

Music
 Montero Lamar Hill (born 1999), known as Lil Nas X, American rapper and singer-songwriter
 Montero (album), a 2021 album by Lil Nas X
 "Montero (Call Me by Your Name)", a 2021 song by Lil Nas X

Places
 Montero, Bolivia, a city and a municipality in Santa Cruz, Bolivia
 Montero District, one of ten districts of Ayabaca, Peru
 Montero Hoyos, a town in Santa Cruz, Bolivia

Vehicles
 Mitsubishi Montero, a 1981–2021 Japanese full-size SUV
 Mitsubishi Montero iO, a 1998–2014 Japanese mini SUV
 Mitsubishi Montero Sport, a 1996–present Japanese mid-size SUV
 BAP Montero (FM-53), a frigate of the Peruvian Navy

Other uses
 Montero Cap, a Spanish hat once used by hunters

See also

 Monteros, a town in Argentina
 Monteiro (disambiguation)
 Mantero, an Argentinian term for a hawker